This is a list of U.S. states and territories by violent crime rate as of 2020. It is typically expressed in units of incidents per 100,000 individuals per year; thus, a violent crime rate of 300 (per 100,000 inhabitants) in a population of 100,000 would mean 300 incidents of violent crime per year in that entire population, or 0.3% out of the total. The data has been taken from the FBI's Uniform Crime Reports.

In the United States, violent crime consists of five types of criminal offenses: murder and non-negligent manslaughter, rape, robbery, aggravated assault, and gang violence.

List

See also 

Crime in the United States
List of U.S. states and territories by intentional homicide rate
List of United States cities by crime rate.
United States cities by crime rate (100,000–250,000)
United States cities by crime rate (60,000-100,000)
Gun violence in the United States by state
List of countries by intentional homicide rate
List of cities by murder rate
List of federal subjects of Russia by murder rate
List of Brazilian states by murder rate
List of Mexican states by homicides
Homicide in world cities

References 

Homicide rate
Homicide rate
U.S. states
Homicide rate
Homicide rate